Nino Buonocore (born 26 July 1958) is an Italian singer-songwriter, best known for the songs "Rosanna" and "Scrivimi".

Life and career 
Born Adelmo Buonocore in Naples, he debuted at 20 years old with an auto-produced single "Sferisterio". Put under contract by RCA, he released several albums with a style close to British new wave and synthpop music of the time. His 2nd album was produced by Simon Boswell. The turning point of his career was his participation in the 1987 Sanremo Music Festival with the song "Rosanna", which was his first real commercial success and marked a transition towards a more melodic and sophisticated style. His biggest hit was the 1990 romantic ballad "Scrivimi", a song which was covered in twelve languages and which sold about 4 million copies.

Discography

Studio albums
     1980 - Acida (RCA)
     1982 - Yaya (RCA)
     1983 - Nino in copertina  (RCA)
     1984 - Nino Buonocore (EMI)
     1988 - Una città tra le mani  (EMI)
     1990 - Sabato, domenica e lunedì (EMI)
     1992 - La naturale incertezza del vivere (EMI)
     1993 - Un po' di più (EMI)
     1998 - Alti e bassi (Easy Records-RTI Music)
     2004 - Libero passeggero, as Nino Buonocore Sextet (Cd+DVD) (La Canzonetta Record)
     2009 - Scrivimi "Greatest Studio Unplugged", as Nino Buonocore Sextet (Azzurra Music)
     2013 - Segnali di umana presenza (Hydra Music)

Compilation albums
     1998 - Il meglio di Nino Buonocore (RCA-BMG)
     2004 - Made in Italy (EMI Italiana)
     2007 - Solo grandi successi (EMI Italiana)
     2009 - Made in Italy - New Version (EMI Italiana)

References

External links
Official website
 Nino Buonocore at AllMusic  
 

1958 births
Musicians from Naples
Italian male singer-songwriters
Italian singer-songwriters
Italian pop singers
Living people